A Collection is a compilation album by Anne Briggs, released by Topic Records in 1999.

The recordings are drawn from The Iron Muse (1963), Edinburgh Folk Festival (1963), Edinburgh Folk Festival Vol. 2 (1964), The Hazards of Love  (1964), The Bird in the Bush (Traditional Erotic Songs) (1966) and Anne Briggs (1971)

Track listing 
Source: Amazon

Personnel 
 Anne Briggs – Vocals, Guitar, Bouzouki
 Johnny Moynihan – Bouzouki

References 

1999 compilation albums
Anne Briggs albums
Topic Records albums